Walter Andre Goffart (born February 22, 1934) is a German-born American historian who specializes in Late Antiquity and the European Middle Ages. He taught for many years in the history department and Centre for Medieval Studies of the University of Toronto (1960–1999), and is currently a senior research scholar at Yale University. He is the author of monographs on a ninth-century forgery (Le Mans Forgeries), late Roman taxation (Caput and Colonate), four "barbarian" historians, and historical atlases.

Two controversial themes in his research concern the Roman policies used when settling barbarian soldiers in the West Roman Empire (Barbarians and Romans and the sixth chapter of Barbarian Tides), and his criticism of the old idea that there was a single Germanic people opposed to the empire in late antiquity, which he believes still influences academics studying the period.

Early life and education
Walter Goffart was born in Berlin on February 22, 1934, the son of Francis-Leo Goffart and Andree Steinberg. His father was a Belgian diplomat, while his mother, born in Cairo, had French and Romanian-Jewish parents.

Goffart was in Belgrade in 1941, where his father was stationed. Just before the German invasion of Yugoslavia, Goffart and his family fled on the Orient Express, passing through Istanbul, Beirut, Jerusalem and Cairo. After 68 days at sea, they eventually reached New York City. Goffart became an American citizen in 1959.

Goffart received his A.B. (1955), A.M. (1956), and PhD (1961) from Harvard University. From 1957 to 1958, he attended the École normale supérieure, Paris.

Career
Goffart became a lecturer at the University of Toronto in 1960. He was made an assistant professor in 1963. In 1965–1966 he was a visiting assistant professor of history at the University of California, Berkeley. He was appointed an associate professor at the University of Toronto in 1966, and a full professor in 1971. In 1967–1968 he was a visiting fellow at the Institute for Advanced Study in Princeton. In 1971–1972 he was the acting director of the Centre for Medieval Studies, Toronto. In 1973–1974 Goffart was a visiting fellow at the Dumbarton Oaks Center for Byzantine Studies. He retired from the University of Toronto as a professor emeritus in 1999. Since 2000, he has been a senior research scholar in history at Yale University. In 2001 he had a residency at the Rockefeller Foundation study center in Bellagio and in 2015 at the Bogliasco Foundation, Genoa.

In 1982, Goffart became a fellow of the Medieval Academy of America, of which he was a councilor in 1977–78. In 1996 he was elected a Fellow of the Royal Society of Canada and was made a Corresponding Fellow of the Royal Historical Society, London. Goffart was a fellow of the American Council of Learned Societies in 1973–74, and a Guggenheim fellow in 1979–80. He has been a member of the International Society of Anglo-Saxonists, the American Historical Association, and the Haskins Society.

In 1991 he received the Haskins Medal of the Medieval Academy of America, for his book, The Narrators of Barbarian History (A.D. 550–800).
Alexander C. Murray edited a Festschrift for Goffart called After Rome's Fall: Narrators and Sources of Early Medieval History (1999).

Theories on Barbarians and the Fall of Rome

Goffart is known as a strong critic of several traditional assumptions which are still common in history writing about the late Roman empire and the early middle ages. He objects to terminology such as "Migration age", and "Germanic peoples", arguing that both these concepts presuppose old assumptions about a single systematic movement against the Romans.
The peoples living to the north of these borders [Roman frontiers from about 370 A.D.] were not newcomers. Some had been settled there for as many as four centuries, others for less but all for long enough to consider themselves well rooted. They were long past the point of having "come" from somewhere and were definitely not "going" anywhere.

Goffart also argues that the use of terms like "German" and "Germanic" to refer to all northern European barbarians in late antiquity has had serious implications for the understanding of events, implying that there was a one-to-one confrontation of Germanic barbarians against Roman civilization. However, even if the barbarians spoke languages in the same family there is no evidence of them being united in any non-linguistic way. Instead, the barbarians "existed in small fragmented groups and had no mechanism for united action".

Among his more detailed theories is the idea that the Western Roman Empire did not collapse as such, but settled "barbarians" using older Roman systems for accommodating military units. To the extent that they were greedy and oppressive, Goffart argued that this was "in the finest tradition of the law-abiding Roman countryside [...] it created rural tyrants".

Goffart has also stressed Roman continuity after the fall of the Western Roman Empire, arguing that the "Germans" are first found in the Carolingian age, when a tradition of having a separate king for Frankish-ruled territories east of the Rhine started.

More recently, the concept of a "Germanic" proto-Europe spread from Germanic studies to early medieval European studies, and was "recast in terms borrowed from constructionist anthropological approaches to ethnicity" into a "vision of an early Europe that was culturally and politically committed to ethnic politics", and Goffart criticized this trend in Barbarian Tides (2006), a work which was "more explicitly concerned than the earlier books with the historiographic framework that has shaped modern interpretations of the period".

Personal life
Goffart has two children from his first marriage. He has been married to the medievalist Roberta Frank since 1977.

Selected bibliography

 "Byzantine Policy in the West under Tiberius II and Maurice: The Pretenders Hermenegild and Gundovald (579–585)", in: Traditio 13 (1957), pp. 73–118 "The Fredegar Problem reconsidered", in: Speculum. A Journal of Medieval Studies 38:2 (1963), pp. 206–41.
 The Le Mans Forgeries (1966)
 "Le Mans, St. Scholastica, and the Literary Tradition of the Translation of St. Benedict," Revue Bénédictine 77 (1967), pp. 107–41.
 Caput and Colonate (1974)
 Barbarians and Romans, A.D. 418–584: The Techniques of Accommodation (1980)
 "Hetware and Hugas: Datable Anachronisms in Beowulf" in: The Dating of Beowulf, ed. Colin Chase (1981), pp. 83–100.
 "Rome, Constantinople, and the Barbarian", in: American Historical Review 86:2 (1981), pp. 275–306.
 The Narrators of Barbarian History (A.D. 550–800): Jordanes, Gregory of Tours, Bede, and Paul the Deacon (1988)
 Rome's Fall and After (1989) (collected studies)
 "The Historia Ecclesiastica: Bede's Agenda and Ours", in: Haskins Society Journal 2 (1990), pp. 29–45.
 "The Theme of 'The Barbarian Invasions' in Late Antique and Modern Historiography", in: W. Goffart (ed.), Rome's Fall and After, London 1989, pp. 111–32.
 "Breaking the Ortelian Pattern: Historical Atlases with A New Program, 1747–1830," in Editing Early and Historical Atlases, ed. Joan Winearls (1995), 49–81.
 "The barbarians in late antiquity and how they were accommodated in the West", in: B. H. Rosenwein and L. K. Little (ed.), Debating the Middle Ages: Issues and readings, Malden, Mass. 1998, pp. 25–44.
 Historical Atlases: The First Three Hundred Years (2003).
 "Conspicuously absent: Martial Heroism in the Histories of Gregory of Tours and its likes", in: K. Mitchell and I. N. Wood (ed.), The World of Gregory of Tours, vol. 8 (Cultures, Beliefs, and Traditions 8), Leiden 2002, pp. 365–93.
 "The front matter of J. G. Hagelgans's 1718 Atlas historicus at Princeton University Library and the Eran Laor Cartographic Collection, Jerusalem," in Princeton University Library Chronicle LXIV, 1 (Autumn 2002), pp. 141–62.
 The narrators of barbarian history (A.D. 550–800). Jordanes, Gregory of Tours, Bede, and Paul the Deacon, Notre Dame 2005.
 "Jordanes's Getica and the Disputed Authenticity of Gothic Origins from Scandinavia", in: Speculum 80 (2005), pp. 379–98.
 "Bede's uera lex historiae explained", in: Anglo-Saxon England 36 (2005), pp. 111–16.
 Barbarian Tides: the Migration Age and the Later Roman Empire (2006)
 "The Name 'Merovingian' and the Dating of Beowulf", Anglo-Saxon England 36 (2007), pp. 93–101
 "Frankish military duty and the fate of Roman taxation", in: Early Medieval Europe 16:2 (2008), pp. 166–90.
 Barbarians, Maps, and Historiography. Studies on the Early Medieval West (2009) (Collected Studies)
 "The Technique of Barbarian Settlement in the Fifth Century: A Personal, Streamlined Account with Ten Additional Comments", in: Journal of Late Antiquity 3:1 (2010), pp. 65–98.
 "The Frankish Pretender Gundovald, 582–585. A Crisis of Merovingian Blood", in: Francia: Forschungen zur westeuropäischen Geschichte 39 (2012), pp. 1–27.
 "Le début (et la fin) des sortes Vandalorum", in: Expropriations et confiscations dans les royaumes barbares. Une approche régionale, ed. Pierfrancesco Porena, Yann Rivière, Roma 2012, pp. 115–28.
 "»Defensio patriae« as a Carolingian Military Obligation" in: Francia: Forschungen zur westeuropäischen Geschichte 43 (2016) pp. 21–39.
 "The Recruitment of Freemen into the Carolingian Army, or How Far May One Argue from Silence?" in: "Journal of Medieval Military History" 16 (2018), pp. 17–34.
 The Industrialist and the Diva: Alexander Smith Cochran, Founder of Yale's Elizabethan Club, and Madame Ganna Walska, Yale 2020.

See also
 Guy Halsall
 Walter Pohl

References

Sources

 
 
 
 
 
 
 
 
 
 
 
 
 
 
 
 
 
 
 
 
 
 
 

External linksCanadian Who's Who 2001, Volume 36'' by Elizabeth Lumley: p. 500
Walter Goffart at Yale University

1934 births
ACLS Fellows
American medievalists
Classical scholars of the Institute for Advanced Study
Fellows of the Medieval Academy of America
Harvard University alumni
Historical revisionism
Living people
Academic staff of the University of Toronto
University of California, Berkeley College of Letters and Science faculty
Yale University faculty
Belgian emigrants to the United States
Historians from California